Viñals is a surname. Notable people with the surname include:

Jaime Viñals (born 1966), Guatemalan mountaineer 
José Viñals (born 1954), Spanish economist and businessman

See also
 Viñales (disambiguation)

Spanish-language surnames